Dimants Krišjānis (born 15 September 1960) is a Latvian former rower who competed for the Soviet Union in the 1980 Summer Olympics.

He was born in Riga and is the younger brother of Dzintars Krišjānis.

In 1980 he was a crew member of the Soviet boat which won the silver medal in the coxed fours event.

External links
 profile

1960 births
Living people
Latvian male rowers
Russian male rowers
Soviet male rowers
Olympic rowers of the Soviet Union
Rowers at the 1980 Summer Olympics
Olympic silver medalists for the Soviet Union
Sportspeople from Riga
Olympic medalists in rowing
Medalists at the 1980 Summer Olympics
World Rowing Championships medalists for the Soviet Union